TGV is a French high-speed train.

TGV may also refer to:

 TGV (box set), a DVD set by Throbbing Gristle
 Tanjong Golden Village, a chain of cinemas in Malaysia
 Tingui-Botó language
 Transposition of the great vessels, a group of heart conditions
 Tanora malaGasy Vonona Young Malagasies Determined, a political movement in Madagascar
 Through-glass via, in semiconductor packaging.